Emu Heights is a locality and suburb of Burnie in the local government area of City of Burnie, in the North West region of Tasmania. The Emu River forms the eastern boundary, and the railway tracks of the Melba line form most of the western. The 2016 census determined a population of 180 for the state suburb of Emu Heights.

History
The municipal area of City of Burnie, of which Emu Heights is part, was proclaimed a city on 26 Apr 1988. It was previously named Emu Bay Municipality. The municipality and the bay to its north were named for the Emu River, which was named in 1827 by explorer Henry Hellyer for emu tracks seen in the vicinity. It is believed that the name of this locality has the same derivation.

Road infrastructure
The C112 route (Old Surrey Road) runs south from the Bass Highway through the locality, and from there provides access to the B18 route (Ridgley Highway) which leads to the Murchison Highway.

References

Suburbs of Burnie, Tasmania
Towns in Tasmania